Goha is a 1958 French-Tunisian film. It starred Omar Sharif and it was the cinema debut of Claudia Cardinale. At the 1958 Cannes Film Festival it was awarded with the Jury Prize and it had been nominated for the Palme d'Or. It was shown as part of the Cannes Classics section of the 2013 Cannes Film Festival.

Cast
 Omar Sharif - Goha (as Omar Chérif)
 Zohra Faiza - Farrideh (as Zohra Faïza)
 Lauro Gazzolo - Taj-el-Ouloum
 Gabriel Jabbour - Sayed Khamis
 Daniel Emilfork - Ibrahim
 Zina Bouzaiade - Fulia
 Claudia Cardinale - Amina
 Ito Ben Lahsen - Chams
 Jean Laugier - L'écrivain public
 Annie Legrand - Loulou

References

External links

1958 films
French drama films
Tunisian drama films
Films directed by Jacques Baratier
1950s French-language films
1950s French films